

This is a list of the National Register of Historic Places listings in downtown Kansas City, Missouri.

This is intended to be a complete list of the properties and districts on the National Register of Historic Places in downtown Kansas City, Missouri, United States. Downtown Kansas City is defined as being roughly bounded by the Missouri River to the north, 31st Street to the south, Troost Avenue to the east, and State Line Road to the west. The locations of National Register properties and districts may be seen in an online map.

There are 342 properties and districts listed on the National Register in Kansas City.  Downtown Kansas City includes 160 of these properties and districts; the city's remaining properties and districts are listed elsewhere.  One historic district overlaps the downtown and non-downtown areas of Jackson County.

Current listings

|}

Former listing

|}

See also
List of National Historic Landmarks in Missouri
National Register of Historic Places listings in Kansas City, Missouri

References

Downtown